The Grant Commercial Historic District in Grant, Nebraska is a  historic district that was listed on the National Register of Historic Places in 1996.  It includes 31 contributing buildings and one other contributing structure.

The district also includes six non-contributing buildings, including the IOOF Hall (1954), at 330-332 Central Avenue.

References

External links 
More photos of the Grant Commercial Historic District at Wikimedia Commons

Historic districts on the National Register of Historic Places in Nebraska
Commercial buildings on the National Register of Historic Places in Nebraska
Buildings and structures in Perkins County, Nebraska
National Register of Historic Places in Perkins County, Nebraska